David Breen Seymour (born 24 June 1983) is a New Zealand politician serving as the Member of Parliament (MP) for Epsom and leader of ACT New Zealand since 2014.

A graduate of the University of Auckland, Seymour worked in public policy in Canada, before returning to New Zealand and contesting for election to Parliament.

Seymour has embraced libertarian social policies since becoming party leader, such as supporting the legalisation of euthanasia, and introduced a bill on this issue. Seymour has appeared extensively on television (including a dance contest, Dancing With the Stars) during his leadership.

Early life

Seymour went to Auckland Grammar School, and the University of Auckland where he graduated with a Bachelor of Engineering (Electrical & Electronic) and a Bachelor of Arts (Philosophy).

Before politics
Seymour worked in Canada as a policy analyst for five years for the Frontier Centre for Public Policy and the Manning Centre.

Seymour is a long-time member of ACT New Zealand, initially becoming involved in the political party as a leader of ACT on Campus. At the 2011 election, he stood for ACT in the  electorate, which was retained by National's Nikki Kaye. After this election, Seymour worked as a ministerial adviser for ACT's successful  candidate, John Banks, who was appointed an Associate Minister of Education for the John Key-led National government. Seymour assisted with the development of the government's Partnership Schools legislation.

In February 2014, Seymour contested and won the nomination to stand as the ACT Party candidate for Epsom in the 2014 general election. Seymour's selection, over former ACT New Zealand deputy leader John Boscawen, was seen by political commentators as "clean slate" choice and a "fresh face", At an Epsom public meeting during this campaign he was seen as "the most popular with the crowd" and "the star of the night, intelligent, witty and articulate". He was the first confirmed candidate for the Epsom electorate.

During the 2014 election campaign, Seymour released a campaign video online which the ACT Party described as going "viral" after it received around 35,000 views. Seymour said of the video: "I think it was just totally real, we didn't set out to make it funny or make it a viral video, it was just me being me, that combination with rather retro production values ... you wouldn't want to watch it standing up."

Member of Parliament

Seymour was endorsed in the Epsom electorate  by Prime Minister John Key, despite Key's National colleague Paul Goldsmith also contesting the electorate. Seymour was elected to Parliament in the Epsom electorate in the 2014 general election with a majority of 4,500 votes based on preliminary results.

He replaced Jamie Whyte as the leader of ACT on 3 October 2014. Seymour was re-elected to Parliament, representing Epsom, in the 2017 general election.

Parliamentary Under-Secretary 
Seymour was appointed Parliamentary Under-Secretary to the Minister of Education and Minister of Regulatory Reform by Prime Minister John Key on 29 September 2014, as a result of National's confidence and supply agreement with ACT. Seymour was given responsibility for partnership schools, and reforms to the Resource Management Act 1991 and other regulation.

In October 2015, a Labour Party member's bill to make parliamentary under-secretaries subject to the Official Information Act passed its first reading in Parliament. Seymour accused the Bill of personally attacking him, and said it was not necessary because under-secretaries did not have decision-making powers.

Contracts in the second round of applications for charter (partnership) schools were completed on 11 September 2014. In January 2016, the contract was terminated for a Northland charter school from the first round, Te Pūmanawa o te Wairua. Seymour continued to support the policy and push for more charter schools to be established.

End of Life Choice Act 

On 6 June 2015, Seymour confirmed that he was preparing a member's bill that would legalise assisted dying after Seales v Attorney-General found that only parliament had the ability to address assisted dying laws. On 14 October 2015, Seymour lodged the End of Life Choice Bill into the member's ballot, launched a website promoting his bill, and released an ACT-commissioned poll of 2800 people showing 66% public support in favour of legalising assisted dying.

On 8 June 2017, Seymour's bill was selected from a member's ballot. The bill was debated at its first reading on 13 December 2017, and passed with 76 votes in favour and 44 against. It was then reviewed by the Justice Select Committee. It reappeared before the House for a second reading 26 June 2019 and passed, with 70 votes in favour, 50 opposed. An amendment to the bill, which included the requirement that it be approved by a binding referendum before it would take effect, passed prior to its third reading with 63 votes in favour and 57 opposed. The bill reappeared before the House and passed its third reading on 13 November 2019 with 69 votes in favour and 51 votes against.

In an interview on the day of the third reading, Seymour said that he was confident that the public would vote to put the Act into law, noting that "there was overwhelming support and it should easily pass the referendum."  The Act was approved in the 2020 New Zealand euthanasia referendum, which was held in conjunction with the 2020 general election, with a majority of voters voting in favour of the Act.

Sale and Supply of Alcohol (Rugby World Cup 2015 Extended Trading Hours) legislation
In August 2015, Seymour introduced a member's bill to allow bars and rugby clubs to extend their bar trading hours when they are televising games from the Rugby World Cup. Most games, due to the time difference between New Zealand and England, started between 4 am and 6 am New Zealand Time, meaning that alcohol would not usually have been allowed to be sold. Despite opposition from the Green Party and the Māori Party, Seymour's bill passed all three readings, meaning that bars and rugby clubs were allowed to open for Rugby World Cup games.

LGBTI cross-party group 
In 2015, Seymour was a member of a cross-party group initiated by Jan Logie to look at and advocate for LGBTI rights. The group consisted of Catherine Delahunty (Green), Chris Bishop (National), Seymour, Denis O'Rourke (NZ First), Denise Roche (Green), James Shaw (Green), Logie (Green), Kevin Hague (Green), Louisa Wall (Labour), Nanaia Mahuta (Labour), Paul Foster-Bell (National), and Trevor Mallard (Labour).

Gun control, 2019
Seymour was the sole Member of Parliament to oppose the Labour-led coalition government's  Arms (Prohibited Firearms, Magazines, and Parts) Amendment Act 2019, which bans all semi-automatic firearms used during the Christchurch mosque shootings that occurred on 15 March 2019. Although he missed an initial procedural vote on the bill, he still cast a No vote when voting on the actual bill took place with a final result of 119 to 1. Seymour criticised the urgency of the Government's gun control legislation.

Abortion Legislation Act 2020
Seymour has supported the Abortion Legislation Act 2020 but has argued that "safe zones" infringe upon freedom of expression. Prior to the third reading of the Bill on 10 March 2020, Seymour successfully included an amendment eliminating safe zones around abortion clinics. The bill passed its third reading on 18 March, receiving royal assent on 23 March.

Zero Carbon Act 2019
Despite announcing that the ACT party would vote against the 2019 Zero Carbon Amendment Seymour was conspicuously absent from the vote on the bill's third reading. This allowed it to pass into law with unanimous support, 119–0, drawing the attention of local media.

2020 general election
During the 2020 New Zealand general election, Seymour contested the Epsom electorate and was re-elected by a margin of 9,224 votes. In addition, ACT won eight percent of the popular vote, winning ten seats in Parliament (with nine on the party list). In the much expanded caucus, Seymour now has the specific portfolios of Finance and COVID-19 Response, while remaining leader.

Coronavirus pandemic
Since 25 March 2020, Seymour has been a member of the Epidemic Response Committee, a select committee that considers the government's response to the COVID-19 pandemic.

Following the Delta variant outbreak that began in August 2021, Seymour released ACT's COVID 3.0 strategy, which advocated replacing the Government's elimination strategy with a "harm minimisation" strategy that focused on isolating infected individuals and easing border restrictions for travellers from low risk countries. In November 2021, Seymour advocated a regular testing regime for unvaccinated workers instead of the Government's vaccine mandate for education, health and hospitality workers.

Public release of Māori vaccination code
In September 2021, Seymour caused a controversy after releasing a special COVID-19 vaccination appointment access code meant exclusively for Māori people in Auckland to his followers on Twitter. The code was intended for the population that is the least vaccinated and most at-risk for COVID-19 demographic in New Zealand. The code offered priority access for Māori who wished to be vaccinated by Whānau Waipareira (a Māori social services agency) at the Trusts Arena in West Auckland. While the move was supported by right-wing groups, it was criticised by Whānau Waipareira CEO John Tamihere and Seymour was faced with allegations of racism towards Māori despite his own Māori heritage.

Seymour defended his actions, stating that "access to vaccination has been the same for people of all ethnic backgrounds." He alleged that the code was a move by the Government that suggested "Māori people have trouble making a booking". He told media that "the virus doesn’t discriminate on race, so neither should the roll out."

Northland checkpoints
Seymour has opposed the proposed joint Police and Māori iwi (tribal) checkpoints that would be used to screen travellers from Auckland heading into the Northland region from 15 December, arguing they would restrict people's freedom of movement. These checkpoints will be located  State Highway 1 in Uretiti and State Highway 12 near Maungaturoto through the initiative of former Mana Movement leader Hone Harawira's Tai Tokerau Border Control. Seymour's criticisms were echoed by National Party leader Christopher Luxon and New Zealand First politicians Winston Peters and Shane Jones. In response, Labour's deputy leader and Te Tai Tokerau Member of Parliament Kelvin Davis alleged that criticism of the iwi-led checkpoints was motivated by anti-Māori racism.

Co-governance
Since 2021, Seymour has been a vocal opponent of co-governance initiatives. In Parliament, he has opposed Three Waters, He Puapua, the Māori Health Authority and the Rotorua District Council (Representation Arrangements) Bill. He said: "The net result [of co-governance] is that someone who's not accountable to the wider community gets the right to say 'no' because of their birth. It's a recipe for frustration at best and resentment and division at worst." After Seymour proposed to abolish the Ministry of Maori development, Labour MP Willie Jackson labelled Seymour a "useless Maori" and "that [he] would 'do anything' for votes."

Seymour advocates for a referendum on co-governance. He has argued, "I think there is a real need for us to have a genuine, high-quality conversation around co-governance." His opinions were supported by Christopher Luxon, who said that New Zealanders should be able to raise concerns without being shut down, but that National did not believe a referendum was necessary.

2022 "arrogant prick" incident
In mid December 2022, Seymour questioned Prime Minister Jacinda Ardern during the Parliamentary Question Time about various issues including hate speech and the Three Waters reform programme. Following the session, Ardern was recorded on a hot mic calling Seymour an "arrogant prick". Since New Zealand parliamentary debates are televised, the comment was aired on television during Question Time. Ardern later issued a personal apology to Seymour for her remark. The two politicians subsequently reconciled and joined forces to raise NZ$60,000 for the Prostate Cancer Foundation by auctioning a signed and framed copy of the Prime Minister's remark.

Personal life and views
Seymour is of Ngāpuhi Māori descent on his mother's side, with his Māori ancestors coming from the Tauwhara marae of the Ngāti Rēhia hapū near Waimate North.

Dancing With the Stars 
Seymour appeared on the seventh series of  Dancing with the Stars. He competed to raise funds for Kidsline, a youth telephone counselling service. His professional dancing partner was Amelia McGregor. Despite harsh criticism from the judges, he finished 5th.

2019 Hong Kong protests
Seymour has defended the rights of pro-democracy protesters in New Zealand during the 2019–20 Hong Kong protests. He criticised the Chinese Consulate-General in Auckland for praising the actions of Chinese students who had allegedly assaulted a Hong Kong student activist erecting a Lennon Wall at the University of Auckland on 29 July 2019. Seymour also spoke at a pro-Hong Kong democracy rally at the University of Auckland on 6 August 2019. Seymour's defence of free speech was praised by blogger Martyn "Bomber" Bradbury.

Criticism of hate speech laws
In mid-May 2019, Seymour generated widespread criticism, including from MPs from all of the other parties, when he stated in a radio interview that Green Party List MP Golriz Ghahraman was a "menace to freedom in [New Zealand]."  Critics suggested Seymour's association of Ghahraman's support for hate speech laws with suppression of free speech by dictators like Mao Zedong and Adolf Hitler was inappropriate. Seymour argued that he had merely "attacked her views".

Seymour's concern is that the strengthening of hate speech laws is "divisive and dangerous" since the power of the state could be used by the majority to "silence unpopular views". He believes, if the law is strengthened, that what is considered hate speech will become "too subjective" and open to being abused.

Electoral history

2005 election

2011 election

2014 election

2017 election

2020 election

Notes

References

External links

 seymour4epsom.co.nz , official campaign website
 Profile, New Zealand Parliament website
 www.lifechoice.org.nz , official website promoting his assisted dying bill

|-

|-

|-

1983 births
21st-century New Zealand politicians
ACT New Zealand MPs
ACT New Zealand leaders
Candidates in the 2017 New Zealand general election
Living people
New Zealand libertarians
New Zealand electrical engineers
Ngāpuhi people
People educated at Auckland Grammar School
People from Palmerston North
University of Auckland alumni
Unsuccessful candidates in the 2005 New Zealand general election
Unsuccessful candidates in the 2011 New Zealand general election
Candidates in the 2020 New Zealand general election
Euthanasia activists